Les Norton is the protagonist in a series of fiction books written by Australian author Robert G. Barrett.

Character
A likeable and laconic Aussie battler, Norton first appears in You Wouldn't Be Dead For Quids (1984) and is described as stockily built and red-haired who doesn't mind a fight, a punt or a root.  He was born in Dirranbandi, and lived there until he was involved in a pub fight, when the local police officer told him to leave before investigators from Brisbane could arrive when he was identified as a person of interest in a subsequent murder investigation.  He moved to Sydney, and ended up living in Bondi, working as a bouncer in an illegal casino in Kings Cross. In later books it turns from an illegal casino to a bridge club, as the club's owner Price Galese has further trouble bribing Police and Government officials to ignore the casino's presence.  Les' career provides many opportunities for training, fighting, sex, dancing, photography, reflection and the odd mystery solving.

Les played rugby league for Easts during his early days in Sydney. He drives a 1968 Ford Falcon in the early stories. In later stories he drives a late model Holden Commodore Berlina that belonged to a man who was murdered in the car. Les tolerates the smell which persists despite having the car regularly detailed. In the later stories he has a house in Bondi which he shares with an advertising executive named Warren.

List of Les Norton Books (in chronological order)
 You Wouldn't Be Dead for Quids
 The Real Thing
 The Boys From Binjiwunyawunya
 The Godson
 Between the Devlin And The Deep Blue Seas
 White Shoes, White Lines and Blackie
 And De Fun Don't Done
 Mele Kalikimaka Mr Walker
 The Day of The Gecko
 Rider on the Storm and Other Bits and Barrett
 Guns 'N' Rose
 Mud Crab Boogie
 Goodoo Goodoo
 The Wind and the Monkey
 Leaving Bondi
 Mystery Bay Blues
 Rosa-Marie's Baby
 Crime Scene Cessnock
 Les Norton and the Case of the Talking Pie Crust
 High Noon in Nimbin

Legacy
In 2000, the Avoca Beach Surf Life Saving Club launched one of its surfboats as the Les Norton.

In 2004, AAP reported that a film adaptation of Barrett's first book You Wouldn't Be Dead For Quids was to be made.  Rugby league player Matthew Johns was slated to star in it, however, an actor for the lead role of Norton's character had not been found.

TV series
As of December 2018, a 10-part Les Norton television series adapted from the series of novels was being produced for ABC, starring Alexander Bertrand as Les Norton with David Wenham and Rebel Wilson.

References

Norton, Les